Crna Reka or Crna Rijeka (Macedonian and Serbo-Croatian for "Black River"), or Crna River may refer to:

Villages

Bosnia and Herzegovina
 Crna Rijeka (Novi Grad), a village in municipality of Novi Grad, Republika Srpska

Serbia
 Crna Reka (Trgovište), a village in municipality of Trgovište

Rivers

Bosnia and Herzegovina
 , tributary of Sava
 Crna River (Vrbas), tributary of Vrbas
 Crna River (Vrbanja), tributary of Vrbanja
 Crna River (Ilomska), tributary of Ilomska
 Crna River (Lepenica), tributary of Lepenica
 Crna River (Željeznica), tributary of Željeznica

North Macedonia
 Crna River (Vardar), tributary of Vardar

Serbia
 , tributary of Ibar
 Crna River or Crni Timok

Other
 Crna Reka Monastery, a monastery in Serbia

See also 
 Black River (disambiguation)